Steven Miller (born November 8, 1956, in New Jersey) is an American record producer and executive. He is best known for his association with Windham Hill Records, where his ambient sound helped create notable instrumental recordings such as Michael Hedges’ Aerial Boundaries, Mark Isham’s Vapor Drawings and George Winston’s December. 

As a guitarist and keyboardist, Miller released a recording of his own compositions, Singing Whale Songs in a Low Voice (on his Hip Pocket/Windham Hill Jazz imprint) which featured Isham and pianist Art Lande. He also worked with many of the other Windham Hill artists, including label founder William Ackerman, Liz Story, Alex de Grassi, Darol Anger, Barbara Higbie, Scott Cossu, Nightnoise, Michael Manring and Andy Narell. Together with Narell, he created the original music for Apple’s early/mid 1980s products, IIe, Lisa, and Macintosh. 

Miller has been actively involved in new technology. He and Ackerman developed a system of pressing records which enabled the label to domestically manufacture and sell audiophile quality lp’s for standard lp retail price. He was also one of the first producers to fully embrace digital recording. During the transition years from vinyl to compact discs, his recordings were frequently played at hi fi shops to demonstrate the CD's exte               /nded dynamic range. In recognition of his work, he was appointed to the board of the RIAA’s Compact Disc Group.

After Windham Hill, Miller worked as an A&R executive at RCA Records and then briefly left the business. Upon returning to music, he has worked independently with a wide range of artists in the singer-songwriter, pop and jazz genres.

Singer-songwriters he has worked with include Richard Marx, Suzanne Vega, Dar Williams, John Gorka, Patty Griffin, David Broza, Paula Cole, and Glen Phillips.

Pop artists include Toad the Wet Sprocket, Pink, Dave Matthews Band, Backstreet Boys, Switchfoot, Chicago, G. Love and Jack Johnson. 

Jazz artists include Manhattan Transfer, Michael Brecker, Medeski, Martin and Wood, Rick Braun, Bobby McFerrin, Paquito D’Rivera, and Dave Valentin. 

In partnership with Allen Sides and Ocean Way Recording in Hollywood, he created Ocean Way Drums – a high end musical instrument plugin that was introduced at the 2008 NAMM show and is available at Guitar Center and other outlets.

In 2014, legendary music journalist Ben Fong-Torres inducted Miller into the San Francisco State University Hall of Fame.

Discography
1983 Singing Whale Songs in a Low Voice (Hip Pocket Records HP-102)

References 
 ‘Windham Hill Records : A Specialist Label that places a Specific Emphasis on Musical Performances and Recording Quality', by Denis Degher, Recording Engineer Producer Magazine, August 1984   
 ‘Producer Steven Miller : Don't Call Me Audiophile’, by Sam Sutherland, Billboard Magazine October 19, 1985
 ‘Dar Williams Set Finds Steven Miller Returned To ‘Guerilla Record-Making’, by Debbie Galante Block, Billboard Magazine, June 8, 1996
 Steven Miller at Allmusic

External links 
 Ben Fong-Torres inducts Miller into Hall of Fame
 Steven Miller records Dave Matthews Band
 Steven Miller at iTunes
 Remembering Michael Hedges 
 Ocean Way Drums

Living people
1956 births
Record producers from New Jersey
American audio engineers
People from New Jersey
San Francisco State University alumni